German submarine U-638 was a Type VIIC U-boat built for Nazi Germany's Kriegsmarine for service during World War II.
She was laid down on 16 October 1941 by Blohm & Voss, Hamburg as yard number 614, launched on 8 July 1942 and commissioned on 3 September 1942 under Kapitänleutnant Oskar Staudinger.

Design
German Type VIIC submarines were preceded by the shorter Type VIIB submarines. U-638 had a displacement of  when at the surface and  while submerged. She had two shafts and two  propellers.

U-638 was fitted with five  torpedo tubes (four fitted at the bow and one at the stern), fourteen torpedoes, one  SK C/35 naval gun, 220 rounds, and one twin  C/30 anti-aircraft gun. The boat had a complement of between forty-four and sixty.

Service history
The boat's career began with training at 5th U-boat Flotilla on 3 September 1942, followed by active service on 1 February 1943 as part of the 9th Flotilla for the remainder of her service.

Wolfpacks
U-638 took part in four wolfpacks, namely:
 Burggraf (26 – 28 February 1943)
 Wildfang (28 February – 5 March 1943)
 Raubgraf (7 – 15 March 1943)
 Amsel 1 (3 – 5 May 1943)

Fate
She managed to send a final signal about the attack and the fact she was sinking. All hands were lost.

Summary of raiding history

References

Bibliography

External links

German Type VIIC submarines
1942 ships
U-boats commissioned in 1942
Ships lost with all hands
U-boats sunk in 1943
U-boats sunk by depth charges
U-boats sunk by British warships
World War II shipwrecks in the Atlantic Ocean
World War II submarines of Germany
Ships built in Hamburg
Maritime incidents in May 1943